Åsa Magnusson   (born 26 September 1964) is a Swedish freestyle skier. 

She won a silver medal in ski ballet at the FIS Freestyle World Ski Championships 1997. She also competed at the 1989, 1991 and 1995 world championships.

References

External links 
 

1964 births
Living people
Swedish female freestyle skiers
20th-century Swedish women